The 1935 Ladies Open Championships was held at the Queen's Club, West Kensington in London from 3–8 December 1934. Margot Lumb won her first title defeating the Honourable Miss Anne Lytton-Milbanke in the final. Three times champion Miss Susan Noel decided not to defend her title. Seeds were inaugurated and the slower ball used in men's competitions was also introduced. The event took place in December 1934 which formed part of the 1934-1935 season.

Draw and results

First round

+ denotes seed

Second round

Third round

Quarter-finals

Semi-finals

Final

References

Women's British Open Squash Championships
Women's British Open Squash Championships
Women's British Open Squash Championships
Women's British Open Squash Championships
Squash competitions in London
British Open Championships